Katrin Thoma (born 7 August 1990) is a German rower. She is a World champion in the quadruple sculls and a World U23 bronze medalist.

References

1990 births
Living people
Rowers from Frankfurt
German female rowers
World Rowing Championships medalists for Germany
20th-century German women
21st-century German women